Brothers Georg Johannes Parikas (30 October 1880 – 22 October 1958) and Peeter Parikas (10 April 1889 – 8 July 1972 Sweden) were Estonian photographers.

In 1910 the brothers established the photo studio and publishing house (company Foto Parikas) in Tallinn. In 1912 the studio got rights to photograph in theatres. In 1949 the studio was nationalised and the studio was acquired by Estonian SSR Theatre Union. Studio's archive consisted of over 20,000 portrait photos. Nowadays the photos are scattered between Estonian memory institutions.

The brothers managed also (with the Märska brothers Theodor and Konstantin) Estonia's first film union: Estonia-Film (registered in 1920). From 1926 to 1931 the brothers published the film magazine Filmileht.

Works

From 1910 to 1940 they published several publications:
 photo album: Tallinn 700 (1920) 
 photo album: Eesti sõnas ja pildis (1923, 1930)
 educational photo book: Fotograafia õperaamat, 1911

References

Further reading
 Eesti Vabariigi fotokuningad Kuninga tänaval. Compiled by B. Ester-Väljaots. Tallinn, 2008
 K. Teder. Eesti fotograafia teerajajaid. Tallinn, 1972
 Ü. Lillak. Foto Parikas – Georg Johannese ja Peetri lugu. – Sirp, 24 November 2000
 J. Lõhmus. Fotograafi(de) jälg. – Postimees, 1 November 2008
 M. Kolk. "Foto Parikas". –Teater. Muusika. Kino 2016, July-August

Estonian photographers
People from Türi Parish